Baker Ninan Fenn (B.N Fenn) is the Bishop of North Kerala Diocese of Church of South India.

Early years
Baker Ninan Fenn  was born on 5 March 1957 to Dr. Fenn and Saramma of Chunangattu Malikayil, Vazhoor in Kottayam district. He had taken undergraduate degree in Theology from  Tamil Nadu Theological Seminary, Madurai and postgraduate degree from Princeton Theological Seminary United States of America .

Ordination & Pastorship
Baker Ninan Fenn was ordained as presbyter in 1987 at Christ CSI Church Munnar, Kerala.

Bishopric
Baker Ninan Fenn was consecrated as the Bishop of North Kerala Diocese on 30 June 2013 at CSI Cathedral, Calicut by CSI moderator G. Devakadaksham. He is the current Anglican Bishop of Diocese of Cochin.

References

1957 births
Living people
Church of South India clergy
Tamil Nadu Theological Seminary alumni
Anglican bishops of North Kerala
Anglican bishops of Cochin